was a Japanese domain of the Edo period.  It is associated with Bungo Province in modern-day Ōita Prefecture on the island of Kyūshū.

In the han system, Kitsuki was a political and economic abstraction based on periodic cadastral surveys and projected agricultural yields.  In other words, the domain was defined in terms of kokudaka, not land area. This was different from the feudalism of the West.

History
At the start of the Edo period, the territory which became Kitsuki (then spelled 木付) was part of the Nakatsu domain (later called Kokura), the 399,000 koku territory ruled by Hosokawa Tadaoki. The territory's name came from the  family, the relatives of the Ōtomo clan, who had once resided there. However, in 1593, Ōtomo Yoshimune incurred the disfavor of Toyotomi Hideyoshi, and had his territory confiscated; the Kitsuki lost their lands at the same time. The land was then passed to Sugiwara Nagafusa, Hayakawa Nagamasa, and finally to Hosokawa Tadaoki in 1599, upon his move from the 120,000 koku fief of Miyazu, in Tango Province. The Kitsuki region, valued at 60,000 koku, was ruled on Tadaoki's behalf by castle wardens (Matsui Yasuyuki, Ariyoshi Tatsuyuki, and others) posted to its central castle. For his distinguished service at the Battle of Sekigahara in 1600, Tadaoki was granted the entire province of Bizen, and moved his seat of government first to Nakatsu Castle, then to Kokura Castle. The Hosokawa remained in Bizen until 1632, when Tadaoki's son Hosokawa Tadatoshi was transferred to the Kumamoto Domain in neighboring Higo Province.

The former Hosokawa landholding in Bizen was partitioned; Ogasawara Tadazane, who had ruled the Akashi Domain of Harima Province, was granted 150,000 koku of land in northern Bizen, with the territory's seat of government being placed at Kokura Castle. The secondary castle of Nakatsu became the center of the new Nakatsu Domain, which was granted to Tadazane's nephew Ogasawara Nagatsugu. Simultaneously, Tadazane's younger brother Ogasawara Tadatomo, who had been a hatamoto, was given Kitsuki Castle and the surrounding 40,000 koku worth of territory, making him a daimyō. Tadatomo retained rulership of Kitsuki until 1645, when he was moved to the Yoshida Domain of Mikawa Province.

Matsudaira Hidechika, the lord of the Takada Domain in Bungo Province replaced Ogasawara Tadatomo as lord of Kitsuki, being given a slightly reduced domain of 32,000 koku. His descendants ruled Kitsuki until the Meiji Restoration. As flatland was scarce in Kitsuki, land reclamation and industrial arts were encouraged; Hidechika brought around 100 peasants with him from Mikawa; they formed what became commonly known as the Mikawa-shinden farmland.

The domain's name spelling was changed in 1711, during the tenure of the third lord, Matsudaira Shigeyasu. Since then, it has been spelled 杵築. Kitsuki domain finances deteriorated due to the major famine in the Kyōho era; Miura Baien, a scholar then residing in the domain, was commissioned to solve the crisis. Among his reforms was the opening of the domain school, the Gakushūkan, in the Tenmei era (1781–1789).

Kitsuki was abolished along with the other Japanese domains in 1871, when it became . It was later absorbed into Ōita Prefecture, and the territory remains part of Ōita to the present day. The former ruling family were made shishaku (子爵) (viscounts) in the new kazoku nobility system in 1884.

List of daimyō 
The hereditary daimyōs were head of the clan and head of the domain.

Ogasawara clan, (1632–1645) (Fudai; 40,000 koku)

Tadatomo

Matsudaira (Nomi) clan, (1645–1871) (Fudai; 32,000 koku)

Hidechika
Shigeyoshi
Shigeyasu
Chikazumi
Chikamitsu
Chikasada
Chikakata
Chikaakira
Chikayoshi
Chikataka

See also 
 List of Han
 Abolition of the han system

References

External links
 Kitsuki Domain on "Edo 300 HTML" (16 Sept. 2007)
 Pictures of Kitsuki Castle

Domains of Japan